West Cliff is a suburb of Bournemouth, Dorset, England. West Cliff is south of Westbourne and east of Branksome in Poole.

Politics 
West Cliff is part of the Bournemouth West constituency.

Transport 
The area is served by the West Cliff Railway.

References 

Areas of Bournemouth
Conservation areas in Dorset